Lois Mai Chan (Chinese: 麥麟屏, July 30, 1934 – August 20, 2014) was an American librarian, author, and professor at the University of Kentucky School of Library and Information Science until 2011. Her publications on cataloging, library classification, and subject indexing were recognized with various awards.

Early life 
On July 30, 1934, Chan was born in Taiwan to Mai Wuzhi and Tuen-Mok Sau-Ng.

Education 
Chan earned a Bachelor of Arts degree in English from National Taiwan University. After moving to the United States, Chan obtained a Master of Arts from Florida State University. Chan earned a Ph.D. degree in English literature from the University of Kentucky.

Career 
In 1966, Chan began her library career as a serials cataloger at the University of Kentucky. By 1980, Chan was a professor in the library sciences department at University of Kentucky. Chan began publishing books in the late 1970s, beginning with Library of Congress Subject Headings: Principles and Application, a text on the Library of Congress (LC) system of subject headings.  She followed with texts on library cataloging, the LC classification scheme, and the Dewey Decimal Classification.

Chan received the American Library Association Margaret Mann Citation for her contributions to the library science profession.

Awards 
 1980 University of Kentucky Alumni Association Great Teaching Award.
 2006 Beta Phi Mu Award for Distinguished Service to Education in Librarianship.

Bibliography
Library of Congress Subject Headings: Principles and Application
Cataloging and Classification: An Introduction
Immroth's Guide to the Library of Congress Classification
Dewey Decimal Classification: a Practical Guide

Personal life 
Chan was married to Shung-Kai Chan. They had two children, Jennifer and Stephen.

On August 20, 2014, Chan died in Kentucky. She was 80 years old.

References

External links
 "Telling Chinese American Librarian's Stories: Lois Mai Chan" (2014 YouTube video), Chinese American Librarians Association

1934 births
2014 deaths
American women librarians
American librarians
Women textbook writers
University of Kentucky alumni
University of Kentucky faculty
National Taiwan University alumni
Florida State University alumni
Taiwanese expatriates in the United States
American librarians of Asian descent